The Journal of Renewable and Sustainable Energy is a free and rapid publishing  peer-reviewed, online-only, open access, scientific journal published by the American Institute of Physics covering most areas of renewable and sustainable energy-related fields that apply to the physical science and engineering communities. Online submissions are posted daily and organized into bimonthly issues. The journal was established in 2009. Since 2019, the Editor-in-Chief is Carlos F. M. Coimbra (University of California San Diego) and the Deputy Editors are Jan Kleissl (University of California San Diego) and Raúl Cal (Portland State University). The journal was founded by Co-Editors-in-Chief P. Craig Taylor (Colorado School of Mines) and John A. Turner (National Renewable Energy Laboratory).

Impact 
The Journal's 2021 impact factor was 2.847.

References

External links 
 

Energy and fuel journals
English-language journals
Monthly journals
Open access journals
Physics journals
Publications established in 2009
Sustainability journals
American Institute of Physics academic journals